Edward Robinson (November 25, 1796 – February 19, 1857) was a United States representative from Maine.  He was born in Cushing, Massachusetts (now in Maine) on November 25, 1796.

He was self-educated while engaged in seafaring.  He then engaged in mercantile pursuits in Thomaston.  He was elected as a  member of the Maine State Senate in 1836 and 1837.  He was elected as a Whig to the Twenty-fifth Congress to fill the vacancy caused by the death of Jonathan Cilley and served from April 28, 1838, to March 3, 1839.

He returned to mercantile pursuits, as well as developing interests in banking, and shipbuilding until his death in Thomaston on February 19, 1857.  His interment is in Thomaston Cemetery.

References

External links

 

1796 births
1857 deaths
People from Thomaston, Maine
Maine state senators
People from Cushing, Maine
Businesspeople from Maine
Whig Party members of the United States House of Representatives from Maine
19th-century American politicians
19th-century American businesspeople